Kula Gourava is a 1971 Indian Kannada language romantic drama film directed by Peketi Sivaram and written by G. Balasubramanyam. It stars Rajkumar in triple roles along with Bharathi and Jayanthi. The film was produced under Sri Eswari Productions of N. Veeraswamy. It had a very successful soundtrack composed by T. G. Lingappa. Popular actor-director V. Ravichandran, son of the film producer Veerasamy, appeared in the film as a child artist. The film swept 5 awards at the 1970-71 Karnataka State Film Awards including the best film, best actor, and best editor categories.

The movie was Rajkumar's first movie in which he played a triple role.It is also his only black and white movie where he played a triple role.The movie was remade in Telugu in 1972 as Kula Gowravam starring N. T. Rama Rao, Aarathi with Jayanthi reprising her role. It was also remade in Tamil in 1974 as Kula Gowravam starring R. Muthuraman, Jayasudha with Jayanthi reprising her role.

Cast

Soundtrack 
The music of the film was composed by T. G. Lingappa and lyrics for the soundtrack written by Chi. Udaya Shankar, R. N. Jayagopal and Vijaya Narasimha.

Track list

Awards 
 Karnataka State Film Awards – 1970–71
 Best Third Film
 Best Actor – Rajkumar
 Best Dialogue – Chi. Udaya Shankar
 Best Editing – P. Bhaktavatsalam
 Best Sound recording – Srinivas

See also 
 Kannada films of 1971

References

External links 
 

1971 films
1970s Kannada-language films
Indian black-and-white films
Indian drama films
Films scored by T. G. Lingappa
Kannada films remade in other languages
Films directed by Peketi Sivaram
1971 drama films